The  "National anthem of the Kingdom of Yugoslavia" was created in December 1918 from the national anthems of the Kingdom's three historical constituent lands: Kingdom of Croatia-Slavonia (Croatia), Kingdom of Serbia (Serbia) and Duchy of Carniola (Slovenia).

At the time, the Yugoslav authorities considered the three dominant South Slavic ethnic groups – Croats, Serbs, and Slovenes – as three interchangeable names for one ethnic group (Serbo-Croatian and  "nation" or "people"), while the Pan-Slavic politicians and parts of academia viewed them as three subgroups of one South Slavic nation ("Yugoslavs"). Accordingly, the official language was thus called Serbo-Croato-Slovene.

History
Although a law on the national anthem did not exist, the anthems of all three South Slavic nations were unified into a single anthem of the Kingdom. It started with a few measures from the Serbian anthem "Bože pravde", continued with a few lines from the Croatian anthem "Lijepa naša domovino", which were in turn followed by a few lines from the traditional Slovenian anthem "Naprej zastava slave". The anthem finished with some lines from the Serbian anthem again.

It was officially used between 1919 and 1941; there was no official document that declared it invalid or void. The Constitution of the Kingdom of Yugoslavia was not in effect after the April capitulation.

Lyrics

See also

 Hej Slaveni

Notes

References

External links

Kingdom of Yugoslavia
Historical national anthems
National symbols of Yugoslavia
Royal anthems
National anthem compositions in B-flat major
Yugoslavia Kingdom